L'Ampélopède is a 1974 French fantasy film directed by Rachel Weinberg and starring Isabelle Huppert.

Plot
A French young woman resents the negative effects of urbanisation and makes up a fantastic strange creature which dwells in a forest.

Cast
 Isabelle Huppert - the narrator
 Patricia Pierangeli - Marie-Thé
 Jean-Marie Marguet - the Ampélopède
 Jean Pignol - Monsieur Pignolet
 Philippe Lehembre - Docteur Saxe
 Louise Dhour - the witch
 Valentine Pratz - Valentine
 Louise Rioton - the lady
 Claude Cernay - the waiter
 Robert Desrouets
 Camille Desmoulins

See also
 Isabelle Huppert on screen and stage

References

External links

1974 films
1970s fantasy films
1970s French-language films
French fantasy films
1970s French films